Hurricane Dorian was the strongest hurricane to affect The Bahamas on record, causing catastrophic damage on the islands of Abaco Islands and Grand Bahama, in early September 2019. The cyclone's intensity, as well as its slow forward motion near The Bahamas, broke numerous records. The fifth tropical cyclone, fourth named storm, second hurricane, and first major hurricane of the 2019 Atlantic hurricane season, Dorian originated from a westward-traveling tropical wave, that departed from the western coast of Africa on August 19. The system organized into a tropical depression and later a tropical storm, both on August 24.

The newly formed Dorian strengthened only gradually over the next few days because of dry air and vertical wind shear. On August 27, Dorian made landfall in Barbados and St. Lucia before entering the Caribbean. Dorian's structure was seriously disrupted after encountering the mountains of St. Lucia, causing the system's center to reform north of its previous location. Moving farther north and east than anticipated, Dorian passed east of Puerto Rico on August 28. Simultaneously, relaxing wind shear and warm sea surface temperatures allowed Dorian to become a Category 1 hurricane as it moved over the United States Virgin Islands. Intensification temporarily stagnated on August 29 before a spurt of rapid deepening began on August 30. During this time, the hurricane turned west-northwestward, then westward, as a ridge built in the subtropics to the north. Dorian achieved Category 5 intensity the highest classification on the Saffir–Simpson scale on September 1.

Dorian weakened steadily throughout September 2; the storm's forward momentum came to a crawl while it was crossing over Grand Bahama. The system fell below major hurricane status on September 3, as it began to accelerate northwards. On September 5, Dorian briefly reintensified into a Category 3 hurricane, as it traversed the warm waters of the Gulf Stream. Increasing wind shear weakened Dorian once again, as it turned northeast and approached the Outer Banks. On September 6, Dorian made landfall on Cape Hatteras as a low-end Category 2 hurricane. As Dorian became increasingly influenced by the westerlies, it transitioned into a post-tropical cyclone on September 7 just before passing over Nova Scotia. It then became fully extratropical the next day over the Gulf of Saint Lawrence and was absorbed by a larger extratropical cyclone on September 9.

Origins and track through the Lesser Antilles
Hurricane Dorian originated from a large tropical wave an elongated trough of low air pressure that departed from the western coast of Africa on August 19, 2019. Around that time, much of the wave's convection or thunderstorm activity was located inland near Guinea and Senegal rather than close to its center. Thunderstorms in the northern portion of the wave were limited by an abundance of Saharan dust in the region. While the wave traveled westward across the low latitudes of the Atlantic, it lost most of its convection before a low-pressure area developed on August 22. Despite being located in an area of moderate vertical wind shear, the system continued to increase in organization. The National Hurricane Center (NHC), initially predicted slow development on August 23 as the system continued westward. However, the system organized into a tropical depression at 06:00 UTC on August 24, while approximately 805 mi (1,295 km) east-southeast of the island of Barbados.

Early in the depression's existence, its southeastern outflow was restricted due to moderate easterly wind shear. The system was upgraded into Tropical Storm Dorian at 18:00 UTC after developing a 10-mile (15 km) wide eye-like feature at its mid-levels and banding features that wrapped around it. Dorian initially intensified while it was located in an environment of warm sea surface temperatures. This trend all but ceased over the next few days as a result of wind shear, as well as abundant mid-level dry air. At that time, composite radar showed that the system lacked a strong inner core. The tropical storm made its second landfall on St. Lucia around 11:00 UTC at the same intensity; the mountainous terrain of the island disrupted the low-level circulation of the system. Soon after, Dorian's center re-developed farther north. Meanwhile, the storm's convection fluctuated as the system continued to be affected by dry air and interacted with the Leeward and Windward islands. Dorian briefly developed a 10-mile (15 km) wide eye on radar on a couple occasions, but it quickly eroded because of mid-level dry air incursions.

Dorian soon took a more northwesterly direction as a result of a weakness in a ridge, caused by a mid- to upper-level low (cold-core cyclone) located to the north of the island of Hispaniola. Although Dorian was initially forecast to make landfall on Hispaniola and subsequently weaken or dissipate over the island, the system's track shifted east of Puerto Rico by August 28 as a result of northerly directional change, as well as the center reformation. Dorian's structure began to improve on the same day, with banding features becoming more prominent and a partial eyewall forming. As Dorian strengthened into a Category 1 hurricane on the Saffir–Simpson scale, it made landfall over St. Croix and St. Thomas in the United States Virgin Islands at 15:30 UTC and 18:00 UTC, respectively. Meanwhile, the cloud pattern of the tropical cyclone was continuing to increase in organization, with an eye becoming apparent on satellite imagery. The hurricane progressed northwestward under the influence of flow between an upper-level low over the Straits of Florida and the Atlantic subtropical ridge. Even though the storm had strengthened and developed a more defined eye, dry air and southwesterly wind shear caused Dorian's intensification to temporarily stagnate before decreasing again. Later, on August 29, a NOAA Hurricane Hunter aircraft reported the presence of concentric eyewalls, indicating that an eyewall replacement cycle had commenced. The aircraft also discovered that the central pressure had fallen. The plane did not find any stronger winds as Dorian continued to track towards the northwest.

Rapid intensification and landfalls in The Bahamas

By the morning of August 30, Dorian completed the eyewall replacement cycle and resumed its intensification trend. The upper-level low steering the hurricane retreated to the south, while the Atlantic subtropical ridge built westward. The storm then moved west, straight towards the northwestern Bahamas. Later that evening, the eye of Dorian cleared out and became surrounded by a ring of deep convection. Meanwhile, a burst of lightning activity occurred in the northwest eyewall, heralding further intensification. A Hurricane Hunter aircraft revealed that Dorian rapidly intensified to Category 4 status at 00:00 UTC on August 31, with surface winds measured to be near . The eye also began to demonstrate a pronounced stadium effect, where the clouds of the eyewall curved outward from the surface with height; this is a feature at times seen in intense tropical cyclones.

Around 12:00 UTC, the NHC estimated the one-minute sustained winds to have reached , making Dorian the strongest hurricane to impact The Bahamas on record. Further deepening occurred over the next couple of hours, with maximum sustained winds reaching  and the minimum central pressure dropping to 910 mbar (hPa), representing Dorian's peak intensity. At this strength, Dorian made landfall over Elbow Cay of the Abaco Islands at 16:40 UTC September 1, becoming the strongest hurricane to make landfall in The Bahamas in modern records.

As Dorian crossed the Abaco Islands, a ridge to the north of the hurricane weakened. The steering flow hence diminished, causing Dorian to decelerate. The system moved off the north coast of Grand Bahama six hours later, still as a Category 5 hurricane, albeit with a larger eye and lower winds because of land interaction and an upwelling of cooler waters beneath the system. These factors, coupled with Dorian's slow motion, caused steady weakening over the next couple of days, with Dorian dropping to Category 3 status at 06:00 UTC September 3. Through this time, Dorian essentially stalled just north of Grand Bahama from 12:00 UTC September 2 to 12:00 UTC September 3, Dorian traveled a distance of just . As a result, the entire island of Grand Bahama experienced winds of at least tropical-storm-force for three consecutive days. Parts of Grand Bahama experienced the eyewall for more than 25 hours, including 5 hours while Dorian was at Category 5 intensity; meanwhile Halls Point spent over 11 hours within Dorian's eye.

Northward turn, extratropical transition, and dissipation

Dorian began a northwestward motion late on September 3 towards the eastern coast of the United States, as an eastward-moving mid-level trough over the Eastern United States pulled Dorian to the north. At the same time, the eye had become cloud-filled, larger, and more ragged. Data collected by reconnaissance aircraft and buoys indicated that the wind field of the storm was expanding. Dorian slowly weakened over the next day after entering an area of cooler sea surface temperatures and high wind shear. The distinctness of the storm's eye waxed and waned as the system continued to pick up forward speed. Soon after, clouds in the eyewall began to cool as Dorian began to restrengthen, facilitated by the warm waters of the Gulf Stream. After the eye cleared and became surrounded by deep convection, the hurricane reached its secondary peak intensity as a 115-mile-per-hour (185 km/h) Category 3 hurricane at 00:00 UTC on September 5, while located off the coast of Georgia. After about 12 hours, Dorian began to gradually weaken as it traveled along the South Carolina coast. Despite being significantly weaker, the storm still possessed a well-defined eye surrounded by deep convection.

Early on September 7, Dorian began to undergo the transition to an extratropical cyclone. The eye completely disappeared from satellite imagery as the storm began to take on a more asymmetric structure. The hurricane's structure degraded due to strong southwesterly shear, with most of its convection displaced to the north and east of the center. Soon after, cold air clouds began to entrain on Dorian's southwestern side, as the storm connected with a warm front that was developing to the northeast. Dorian became a post-tropical cyclone around 18:00 UTC on September 7 after losing much of its tropical characteristics. Despite this, the NHC opted to continue issuing advisories on the system, due to the threat it posed to Atlantic Canada. At the time, an ASCAT pass showed a region of  winds in the storm. Dorian made landfall near Sambro Creek in Nova Scotia, Canada, at approximately 22:00 UTC. The storm gradually turned towards the east as it became embedded within the extratropical westerly flow. The storm was deemed to have fully completed its extratropical transition over the Gulf of Saint Lawrence by 06:00 UTC on September 8. Dorian's cloud pattern gradually decayed, with the storm weakening to tropical storm-force by 18:00 UTC. By September 9, virtually no significant convection existed near the center of Dorian. Dorian was ultimately absorbed by a larger extratropical cyclone at 06:00 UTC on September 9, while located northeast of Newfoundland.

Records

Dorian broke numerous intensity records after it reached its peak intensity. This intensity made Dorian the strongest hurricane outside of the tropics. The cyclone's  landfall on Abaco Island was the strongest on record for The Bahamas. Dorian was the second Category 5 hurricane to make landfall on the Abaco Islands on record, the other having occurred in 1932. Additionally, Dorian is tied with the 1935 Labor Day hurricane for the highest sustained winds at landfall in an Atlantic hurricane. With Dorian, 2019 became the fourth consecutive year to produce at least one Category 5 hurricane.

Dorian's slow forward motion near The Bahamas also set several records. During one 24-hour period, Dorian moved slower than any other major hurricane since Hurricane Betsy in 1965. The storm also impacted a single land area as a Category 5 hurricane for the longest duration recorded in the Atlantic basin, with portions of Dorian's eyewall striking Great Abaco Island and Grand Bahama for about 22 hours.

See also

 Tropical cyclones in 2019
 List of Category 5 Atlantic hurricanes
 1932 Bahamas hurricane – A Category 5 hurricane that caused damage throughout The Bahamas
 Hurricane Joaquin (2015) – Another slow-moving hurricane that devastated The Bahamas at Category 4 strength
 Hurricane Matthew (2016) – A hurricane that made landfall on Grand Bahama at Category 4 status, causing extensive damage

Notes

References

External links

 The National Hurricane Center (NHC)'s advisory archive on Hurricane Dorian

Meteorological histories of individual tropical cyclones
Hurricane Dorian